Podopteryx is a damselfly genus. It belongs in the family Argiolestidae.
They are very large damselflies found in Indonesia, New Guinea and Australia.

Species 
The genus Podopteryx has two described species:

 Podopteryx casuarina Lieftinck, 1949
 Podopteryx selysi (Foerster, 1899) - Treehole Flatwing

References

Calopterygoidea
Zygoptera genera
Odonata of Asia
Odonata of Australia
Taxa named by Edmond de Sélys Longchamps